Miramar (Spanish for "Sea View") is a neighborhood in the northern part of the city of San Diego, California, United States. It includes residential areas and commercial and light industrial districts.

Most residents live on the Marine Corps Air Station Miramar (formerly Naval Air Station Miramar). Miramar was the site of the real TOPGUN flight school made famous by the movie Top Gun in 1986. NAS Miramar was realigned by the Base Realignment and Closure (BRAC) program in 1995 and turned over to the Marine Corps as a fixed wing and helicopter base in 1999. To the north of MCAS Miramar is the suburb of Mira Mesa. The neighborhood is located in City Council District 7 and is represented by Council member Scott Sherman.

History 
Miramar was originally part of Scripps Ranch, founded by Edward W. Scripps. He named the home he built on the ranch Miramar in the 1890s, after Archduke Maximilian's castle Miramare in Trieste, Italy. The name eventually became applied to the surrounding mesa. Loosely translated from  Portuguese, Italian or Spanish, it means "a view of the sea".

Before becoming a military base in 1950, Miramar was a small, isolated community centered on a railroad station. No buildings from the original Miramar survived.

Over time, a Little India commercial community developed on Black Mountain Road.

Economy 
The Miramar submarket consists of approximately 14 million square feet of distribution, warehouse, office, and Miramar Road frontage retail related space. Miramar is one of San Diego County's most recognized real estate markets due in part to its central location, size, and traditional industrial characteristics. This market historically maintains one of the highest occupancy rates in the county. Recent occupancy rates were approximately 91%.

See also

 Ruby Peters Miramar before the planes: of the U.S. Naval Air Station at San Diego, California; a rural settlement and one room school 1890-1950. (1984)

References

External links
 Marine Corps Air Station Miramar Official Site

Neighborhoods in San Diego